Ashton Hall railway station was a private halt in Lancashire, England. Located on the Glasson Dock branch line, it was opened to serve Ashton Hall, the home of Lord Ashton, a local businessman. The house is now Lancaster Golf Club.

History

Opened by the London and North Western Railway, the station passed to the London, Midland and Scottish Railway during the Grouping of 1923, and was closed seven years later.

The site today
The station still stands. The trackbed through it is now part of the Lancashire Coastal Way, and the platform is just visible from under the foliage.

References 
 
 
 Geograph

Former London and North Western Railway stations
Disused railway stations in Lancaster
Railway stations in Great Britain opened in 1883
Railway stations in Great Britain closed in 1930